The Corps of Guides was an administrative corps of the Permanent Active Militia in Canada.

Formation

Lieutenant-Colonel Victor Brereton Rivers, a former officer cadet at the Royal Military College of Canada was one of the first of a small band of Canadian military intelligence officers serving in an organization that was in effect the forerunner of Canadian Forces Intelligence Branch as it is known today. He carried out the necessary staff work which led to the formation of the "Canadian Corps of Guides"  (C of G) as authorized by "General Order 61 of 01 April 1903." This order directed that at each of the 12 military districts across Canada there would be a district intelligence officer (DIO) whose duties included command of the C of G in his district.

The C of G was a mounted corps of Non-Permanent Active Militia with precedence immediately following the Canadian Engineers.  The officers, non-commissioned officers (NCOs), and men were appointed individually to the headquarters staffs of various commands and districts to carry out intelligence duties.  From the authorizing order, it is apparent that one of the functions of the C of G was to ensure that, in the event of war on Canadian soil, the defenders would possess detailed and accurate information of the area of operations.  The ranks of the C of G were filled quickly, and by the end of 1903, the general officer commanding the militia was able to report that, "the formation of the Corps has been attended by the best possible results.  Canada is now being covered by a network of Intelligence and capable men, who will be of great service to the country in collecting information of a military character and in fitting themselves to act as guides in their own districts to forces in the field.  I have much satisfaction in stating that there is much competition among the best men in the country for admission into the Corps of Guides.  Nobody is admitted into the Corps unless he is a man whose services are likely to be of real use to the country."

The training of the corps began at once under the supervision of the director of intelligence.  Special courses stressed the organization of foreign armies, military reconnaissance, and the staff duties of intelligence officers.  Instruction in drill and parade movements was kept to a minimum.  Although primarily made up of individual officers and men, there was also an establishment for a mounted company of the corps with one company allocated to each division.  The strength of the company was 40 all ranks.

Each military district was sub-divided into local guide areas.   The head of this organization was "a Director General of Military Intelligence (DGMI)," under the control of the general officer commanding (GOC).  "The DGMI was charged with the collection of information on the military resources of Canada, the British Empire, and foreign countries."

"The first DGMI was Brevet-Major William A.C. Denny, Royal Army Service Corps, psc, a veteran of South Africa."  His staff included LCol Victor Brereton Rivers as ISO and two AISOs, Captain A.C. Caldwell and Captain W.B. Anderson responsible respectively for the Information and Mapping Branches, three lieutenants, a sergeant and two NCOs.  All officers and men in the districts were Militia.  (As late as 1913 there were less than 3,000 men serving in the Canadian Militia).   This was the basic organization for military intelligence with which Canada entered the Great War.  Captain R.M. Collins, the Secretary of the Australian Defence Department, who had recently visited Canada, reported that:

"The Canadian Forces were run by a Militia Council, similarly constituted to the Australian Military Board with the Minister as President and the First Military Member.  The Chief of the General Staff (CGS) had the responsibility to "advise on questions of general military policy; Intelligence, and preparation for war; as well as the education of staff officers.  Of particular interest was the fact that there were two Intelligence Officers on the Canadian Staff, assisted by a Corps of Guides element (consisting of 185 Militia officers) which had been raised on 1 April 1903."  

A report was prepared following his visit, recommending that provision be made for a Director of Education and a Director of Intelligence, as this was the only way that the many duties assigned to the Chief of Intelligence could be properly discharged.  He pointed to the Canadian example as a sound arrangement to emulate.

The Canadian C of G were responsible for the collection of military information, and their duties were described as follows:  "The Guides should be intelligent men and capable of active work with a knowledge of the topographical features of the country as well as the roads, the country between the roads, sidepaths, names of farmers, etc., in the area, and when possible, should be in possession of a horse."

Uniform and insignia

Prior to the outbreak of war, the full dress uniform of the Canadian Corps of Guides comprised a khaki "lancer style" tunic with scarlet plastron, cuffs and collars. The tunic was piped in scarlet, as were the khaki trousers. A white helmet with bronze spike and scarlet/khaki puggaree was included for parade dress.

World War I

When the Great War broke out, "the Corps of Guides volunteered for service in a body and a concentration...moved to Valcartier as part of the general mobilization" then in progress.  It quickly became evident however, "that the Corps could not be employed under the conditions of warfare" for which it had been designed.  General Sir Arthur Currie  recorded:

"The Corps of Guides was absorbed into existing Units and formations.  Officers to the number of about thirty were absorbed into Staff posts and various regimental and special duties.  Owing to their special training in reconnaissance and scout duties generally, the officers appointed to Staff duties were utilized essentially as Staff Captains for Intelligence and General Staff Officers.  Non-Commissioned Officers and men were absorbed into cavalry, horse artillery and various other Staff duties and, subsequently, into the Cyclist Corps which later became the natural channel for the absorption of the Guide personnel."

1920s

After the war, the Director of Military Operations and Intelligence (DMO&I), Col J. Sutherland-Brown, had planned to convert the C of G Units and to use the newly created Cyclist companies as divisional Troops for security and protection duties.  Using the Cyclists for screen protection was the old role of light cavalry Units, however, and traditionally not a function of the C of G.

Only a few companies were formed and training was limited.  No training was authorized in 1920, and between 1922 and 1924, it was restricted to 50% of the establishment.  In 1926, the company establishment was changed to one Major, one Capt, four Lieutenants, one Warrant Officer level 2, one Company Quarter-Master Sergeant, one Sergeant (artificer), four Sergeants, eight Corporals, one driver, two cooks, six batmen, and 88 Privates.  Equipment consisted of 2 horses, 117 bicycles, and 1 wagon.  The horses, wagon, and, at least in the early days, the bicycles, had to be hired for the camp period.  The organization was much the same as it had been in wartime, consisting of an HQ of 10, and 4 platoons of 27, for a total of 118 all ranks.

Junior officer training included normal military subjects, plus instruction in such special-to-corps subjects as characteristics of Cyclists, platoon drill with bicycles, Cyclists in reconnaissance, employment of Cyclists for protection, tactical action of Cyclists, map-reading and field sketching, employment of Cyclists with corps or divisional Troops, the role of the Unit in war, and almost as an afterthought, Intelligence in peace and war.  Captains had to know these subjects and, in addition, become proficient in dismounted action and the employment of Cyclists in coast defence.  Majors had to have a full knowledge of Intelligence in peace and war.  NCOs took a modified version of the subaltern's course.

Corps of Guides prize

The Corps of Guides (Canada) prize was awarded from 1926 to 1941 (except 1940) to the gentleman cadet at the Royal Military College of Canada in Kingston, Ontario earning the greatest number of marks in map reading and field sketching throughout his whole course. Between 1941 and 1952, no awards were made. Thereafter, the Corps of Guides was awarded for surveying and field sketching.

End of the Corps

In the 1920s, the role of the Cyclists and the methods used to fill it had lost their appeal.  Recruiting declined, and few companies were really active.  Among the active were the two in Toronto, through which passed some 855 all ranks between 1912 and 1929.  Small Units cost a great deal to administer for little apparent return.  General Order 191, 1 December 1928, disbanded the Guides effective 31 March 1929.

The disbanding of the Guides meant that only a small staff was left in Ottawa and in some of the military districts to carry out the Intelligence functions in Canada.

References

Sources
Harold A. Skaarup, Out of Darkness – Light, a History of Canadian Military Intelligence, volume one, Pre-Confederation to 1982. Lincoln, Nebraska, iUniverse.com,  2005.
 Hahn, Major J. E. he Intelligence Service Within the Canadian Corps 1914-1918. Toronto, Ontario: Macmillan, 1930.

Army units and formations of Canada in World War I
Military units and formations established in 1903
Administrative corps of the Canadian Army